Francis Konrad Schuckardt (July 10, 1937 – November 5, 2006) was an American Traditionalist Catholic independent bishop.

Schuckardt is described by Michael W. Cuneo as "the rock-and-roll outlaw of Catholic traditionalism—the bad influence that people somehow can't bring themselves to stop talking about. During the late sixties and early seventies, Schuckardt almost single-handedly founded an influential community in the Pacific northwest that was characterized by a peculiar blend of Catholic survivalism, paranoia, and lockstep dogmatism." Schuckardt was noted in 1997 as being of "immense symbolic importance" to the Catholic extreme right, despite the fact Schuckardt had "spent much of the past decade either on the run or in hiding".

Early life 
Francis Konrad Schuckardt was born in Seattle, Washington on July 10, 1937 to Frank and Gertrude Schuckardt. He graduated from O'Dea High School in 1954 and from Seattle University in 1959 with a bachelor's degree in education and linguistics.

Blue Army of Our Lady of Fatima 
In 1958 Schuckardt joined the Blue Army of Our Lady of Fatima, a mainstream Catholic Marian organisation. He later became one of the Blue Army's highest administrators. In 1967, Schuckardt was dismissed from the organisation for publicly rejecting Vatican II.

Fatima Crusade
In 1968, Schuckardt founded a Catholic traditionalist community based in Coeur d'Alene, Idaho, called the Fatima Crusade.

Episcopal consecration 
In 1971, Schuckardt was ordained a bishop by Daniel Q. Brown; the same year, Schuckardt changed the name of the group to Tridentine Latin Rite Church.

Positions 
Schuckardt was a sedevacantist.

He insisted that the Traditional Latin Rite Catholic Church is not a "new church", but the same Catholic Church that existed for almost two millennia prior to the changes imposed by Vatican II. His followers refer to the church generally recognized as the Roman Catholic Church as the "Modern Catholic Church" or the "Post-Vatican Council II Church". They labelled Paul VI the "arch-heretic of Rome" and referred to the mainstream church as "the Church of the Beast". "Who would be so bold or so foolish as to call these bishops Catholic or to pretend that they possess any legitimate authority? Including the arch-heretic in Rome?"

A Spokesman Review article states that Schuckardt claimed to be the only true Catholic bishop.

As related in a Spokesman Review article from 1983, Schuckardt is quoted as saying: "Some of our teachers, studying the French revolution, saw the origins of the red, white, and blue, which was adopted then. The red represented the thousands of bishops and priests who were nailed to the church doors."

Criticism
Bishop Lawrence Welsh, Bishop of the Diocese of Spokane, wrote of Schuckardt in the Inland Register (a diocesan newspaper): "Bishop Schuckardt has received no mission from the church universal and does not accept the unity of the apostolic office. Yet these are some of the very elements which make the Church Roman Catholic." In another section Bishop Welsh adds: "[T]hey deny the teaching authority of the Second Vatican Council and the last four Popes. Implicitly Bishop Schuckardt has set himself up as the final and last arbiter of Catholic tradition."

One of Schuckhardt's beliefs and policies drew criticism: the dress code for women, which was to be modest. Women were required to have long dresses and counseled to keep their heads covered at all times.

Falling out in Spokane 
In April 1984, four former seminarians reported that they had been sexually abused by Schuckardt.

Charges 
On June 3, 1984, Denis Chicoine made several public charges from the pulpit against Bishop Schuckardt, related in a Spokesman Review article on August 26, 1984.

Schuckardt's response to the charges 
Regarding Chicoine's allegation of finding large amounts of cash and out-of-day checks, the Spokesman Review quoted Bishop Schuckardt as saying "an assistant failed to properly handle the matter and that he was unaware of the problem."

Legal battles between CMRI and Schuckardt 
In an article by Tim Hanson that appeared in the Spokesman Review article on August 26, 1984 Schuckardt is quoted as saying: "If there is some way I can just let the people know we didn't run away. We were sent away. We were thrown out of our home. If there was anyway we could have stayed there, we would have. They must know that it was made impossible." The article goes on to state that On June 7, 1984 Chicoine filed a lawsuit in Superior court asking that Schuckardt and 10 of his associates be prohibited from returning to the church property at Mount St. Michael's or Schuckardt's mansion at E2314 South Altamont Blvd.

After leaving Spokane, they moved around and finally settled in Greenville, California. “One of the main reasons we move is because of the harassment we’ve been getting from Chicoine” stated loyal Bishop Schuckardt follower, Brother Mary Fidelis, “They're trying to do anything they can to destroy us, literally. We fear harm, physical harm, coming to the Bishop. We wouldn't put anything past them.” As further reported by Jim Sparks in the Spokesman Review. On May 9, 1987 a Plumas County, California Sheriff's Department SWAT team, with support from the California Highway Patrol, conducted a raid on the TLRCC.

Later life 
For the remainder of his life Schuckardt lived in the Seattle area. As reported November 2005, the TLRCC had about 100 members in the area. The article states: "At the heart of the mysterious group lies its founder, Francis Konrad Schuckardt, a charismatic leader who considers himself to be the true Pope, according to members of the group." The church has no public address or telephone number.

In 2002 a reporter from The Seattle Times attempted to obtain an interview with Schuckardt for an article, but requests were denied because of health reasons, although the reporter was allowed to conduct an extensive interview with 6 Church members and given access to Church services.

References

External links
Personal website

1937 births
2006 deaths
Traditionalist Catholic bishops
Sedevacantists
Seattle University alumni
Bishops of Independent Catholic denominations
American traditionalist Catholics